State Route 163 (SR 163) is a  long east–west state highway in the northwestern portion of the U.S. state of Ohio.

Route description
The path of SR 163 takes it through the northeastern portion of Wood County and the entire width of Ottawa County.  No segment of this state route is included within the National Highway System.

History
The SR 163 designation was applied in 1923.  Originally, the highway ran along its present routing from its intersection with SR 51, at the time a part of SR 2 and later designated as the now-defunct SR 102, on the outskirts of Genoa, and its eastern terminus near Marblehead.  SR 163 was extended west into Wood County along a previously un-numbered road from Genoa to its present western terminus at US 20 southeast of Perrysburg.

Major intersections

References

External links

State Route 163 Endpoint Photos

163
Transportation in Wood County, Ohio
Transportation in Ottawa County, Ohio